Mario Ernesto O'Donnell Ure (born 28 October 1941), known as "Pacho O'Donnell", is an Argentine writer, politician, historian and physician who specializes in psychoanalysis.

Career
After the return to democracy in Argentina in 1983, he was named Secretary of Culture of the city of Buenos Aires. He ran unsuccessfully for the 1988 presidential nomination in the Radical Civic Union primaries, but later became a Peronist and was elected to the Argentine Senate for the city of Buenos Aires in 1998. President Carlos Menem appointed O'Donnell Ambassador to Bolivia and Paraguay, as well as Secretary of Culture. He was elected to the Buenos Aires City Legislature in 2002.

He is currently engaged on the diffusion of Argentine historical knowledge, being part of the "neorevisionist" school which contests the official reading of history imposed in Argentina (democracy being restored only in 1983), and hosted the television show Historia confidencial (Confidential History) with fellow historians José Ignacio García Hamilton and Felipe Pigna.

He received the "Isabel la Católica" ("Isabella the Catholic") order from the Spanish King Juan Carlos I of Spain, and the "Palmas Académicas" ("Academic palms") in France. The legislature of Buenos Aires honoured him as illustrious citizen in October 2009.

Family
Born in Buenos Aires to  Mario Antonio O'Donnell Suárez and Susana Lucrecia Ure Aldao, he is married to Susana Evans Civit, with whom he has five children. His brother, Guillermo, was a noted political scientist.

Works

Fiction

Short stories
La seducción de la hija del portero (1975)

Novels
Doña Leonor, los rusos y los yanquis (1981)
El tigrecito de Mompracén (1980)
Las hormigas de Carlitos Chaplín (1977)
Copsi (1973; the title is a combination of Coca and Pepsi)

Non fiction

Essays and history
El Prójimo
Juana Azurduy, la Teniente Coronela (1994)
El descubrimiento de Europa (1992)
Monteagudo, la pasión revolucionaria
El grito sagrado, with Alejandro Dolina
El águila guerrera
El rey blanco
Juan Manuel de Rosas, el maldito de nuestra historia oficial
El Che
Los héroes malditos
Historia confidencial, with José García Hamilton and Felipe Pigna

Psychology
Analisis freudiano de grupo (1984)
El juego – Técnicas lúdicas en psicoterapia
La teoría de la transferencia en psicoterapia grupal (1977)
Teoría y técnica de la psicoterapia grupal (1975)
Psicología Dinámica Grupal (1980)

References

External links
Official site (in Spanish). It has excerpts of his latest historical works.

1941 births
20th-century Argentine historians
Argentine male writers
Members of the Argentine Senate for Buenos Aires
Members of the Buenos Aires City Legislature
Argentine diplomats
Argentine people of Irish descent
Radical Civic Union politicians
Justicialist Party politicians
Living people
Illustrious Citizens of Buenos Aires
Ambassadors of Argentina to Bolivia
Ambassadors of Argentina to Paraguay